The 2021–22 Texas Longhorns men's basketball team represented the University of Texas at Austin in the 2021–22 NCAA Division I men's basketball season. They were led by first-year head coach Chris Beard and played their home games at the Frank Erwin Center in Austin, Texas as members of the Big 12 Conference. They finished the season 22–12, 10–8 in Big 12 play to finish in fourth place. As the No. 4 seed in the Big 12 tournament, they were defeated in the Quarterfinals by TCU. They received an at-large bid to the NCAA tournament as the No. 6 seed in the East Region, where they defeated Virginia Tech in the First Round before losing to Purdue in the Second Round.

This was the Longhorns' final season at the Frank Erwin Center, with the new Moody Center opening for the 2022–23 season.

Previous season
In a season limited due to the ongoing COVID-19 pandemic, the Longhorns finished the 2020–21 season 19–8, and 11–6 in Big 12 play, finishing in a tie for third place. As the No. 3 seed in the Big 12 tournament, they defeated Texas Tech in the first round and advanced to the tournament championship game due to COVID-19 issues at Kansas. There, they defeated Oklahoma State to win the Big 12 Tournament championship. As a result, they received the conference's automatic bid to the NCAA tournament as the No. 3 seed in the East region. They were upset in the First Round by Abilene Christian.

On March 26, 2021, head coach Shaka Smart left the school to take the head coaching job at Marquette. Shortly thereafter, the school named Texas Tech coach Chris Beard the team's new head coach.

Offseason

Departures

Incoming transfers

Coaching staff departures

Recruiting classes

2021 recruiting class

2022 recruiting class

2021 NBA draft

Preseason

Award watch lists 
Listed in the order that they were released

Big 12 media poll

Preseason All-Big 12 teams

1st team 

Marcus Carr – G (Coaches, Media)

Honorable Mention

Andrew Jones – G (Coaches, Media)

Tre Mitchell – C (Coaches, Media)

Preseason Big 12 Awards

Roster

Schedule and results

|-
!colspan=9 style=|Exhibition

|-
!colspan=9 style=|Regular season

|-
!colspan=9 style=|Big 12 Tournament

|-
!colspan=9 style=|NCAA tournament

Source:

Player statistics

Awards and honors

Source:

Source:

Rankings

^Coaches did not release a Week 1 poll.

See also
2021–22 Texas Longhorns women's basketball team

References

Texas Longhorns
Texas Longhorns
Texas Longhorns
Texas Longhorns men's basketball seasons
Texas Longhorns